Leo Francis Gately (15 June 1937 – 25 August 2021) was an Australian politician.

He was born at West Wyalong to Patrick Leo Joseph Gately and his wife Eleanor Agnes, née Barton. On 3 September 1960, he married Helen Gallagher, with whom he had FOUR children. From 1971 to 1973, he sat on Newcastle City Council and served as a member of the New South Wales Police Force, before moving to Queensland, where he became involved with the National Party. He served one term (1986–89) as the member for Currumbin in the Queensland Legislative Assembly before being defeated at the 1989 state election by the Liberal candidate, Trevor Coomber.

References

1937 births
2021 deaths
National Party of Australia members of the Parliament of Queensland
Members of the Queensland Legislative Assembly
People from Newcastle, New South Wales
New South Wales local councillors